Matt Bower (born 11 December 1998) is an English professional footballer who plays as a defender for Yate Town.

Club career
Bower joined Cheltenham Town in 2010, and signed his first professional deal in July 2016 following the Robins promotion back to the Football League. Prior to this, Bower made his first-team debut for Cheltenham during their FA Trophy tie against Oxford City, replacing Cian Harries in their 2–2 draw. Bower also enjoyed a short-term loan spell at Cirencester Town between March and April 2016, where he featured ten times for the Southern League Premier Division side. On 19 August 2017, Bower made his League Two debut for Cheltenham during their 3–0 away defeat against Carlisle United, replacing Will Boyle in the 85th minute. After playing in a trial game for Stoke City in late September he then signed a new contract for the 2018-19 season on 6 February.

On 28 June 2019, Bower joined Bath City on a one-year contract. On 15 October 2019, he was loaned out to Stratford Town. On 30 January 2020, he joined Cinderford Town.

On 28 July 2020 he signed for Yate Town.

Career statistics

References

External links

1998 births
Living people
English footballers
Association football defenders
Cheltenham Town F.C. players
Cirencester Town F.C. players
Weston-super-Mare A.F.C. players
Bath City F.C. players
Stratford Town F.C. players
Cinderford Town A.F.C. players
English Football League players
Southern Football League players